James River (Scottish Gaelic: Abhainn Sheumais) is a community in the Canadian province of Nova Scotia, located in Antigonish County. The Riverside International Speedway is located here.

Etymology 
James River may have been named for the Reverend James Munro, a Presbyterian minister who settled in the Antigonish area in 1797, remaining there from 1808 to 1818.

References

Communities in Antigonish County, Nova Scotia